My Dearest Senorita is a 1972 Spanish film directed  by Jaime de Armiñán. A romantic drama on the subject of sex change and intersexualism, it was the first Spanish film that talked about sexual orientation, which was a taboo subject in Spain during Franco's regime.

The film was released by In Cine, the Spanish division of Cinerama Releasing.

Plot
Adela is a 43-year-old spinster who lives alone in an isolated northern provincial Spanish village. She spends her days sewing and doing charity work. Never feeling particularly attracted to men, she is waited upon in her home by her faithful maid, Isabel (whom she affectionately calls Isabelita), who adores her.

One day, the local bank manager starts to court Adela and sets his sights on marriage. Adela, repulsed by his physical overtures, consults the local priest and confesses that, while she has never been physical with a woman, feels "embarrassed" around them. On his advice, she resolves to consult a doctor. After a row, Adela fires Isabel; upon seeing her doctor, Adela is informed that she is not a woman after all, but a man. The former Adela moves to Madrid and takes on a new masculine identity, "Juan".

After trying to obtain income with no identity card, Juan runs into Isabel, working as a waitress in a local coffee shop. Soon, Juan begins using his sewing skills (the only skill he has) to bring in a small income and enable him to obtain a work permit. Soon, he falls in love with Isabel, who reciprocates his feelings. However, out of fear, he resists consummating their relationship. Finally, they successfully make love; afterwards, he says that one day he will tell her something "very important"; Isabelita surprises him by responding, "There is no need, señorita", showing that she already knew his secret.

Cast
 José Luis López Vázquez	... 	Adela Castro Molina/Juan
 Julieta Serrano	... 	Isabelita
 Antonio Ferrandis	... 	Santiago
 Enrique Ávila	... 	Father José María 
 Lola Gaos	... 	Aunt Chus
 Chus Lampreave	... 	Chus' niece
 Mónica Randall	... 	Feli
 José Luis Borau    ...  Doctor

Reception
The film attracted international attention and was nominated for an Academy Award for Best Foreign Film in 1973.

See also
 List of submissions to the 45th Academy Awards for Best Foreign Language Film
 List of Spanish submissions for the Academy Award for Best Foreign Language Film

References

Notes
Director Jaime de Armiñán and actress Julieta Serrano speak about film at 35 mm de cine español
 Schwartz, Ronald, The Great Spanish Films: 1950- 1990,Scarecrow Press, London, 1991,

External links 
 

1972 films
1970s Spanish-language films
1972 LGBT-related films
1972 drama films
Spanish LGBT-related films
Films directed by Jaime de Armiñán
Transgender-related films
Films with screenplays by Jaime de Armiñán